The Zapata Times is a weekly newspaper publication in Zapata, Texas, USA. It is produced by the Laredo Morning Times which is owned by the Hearst Corporation. The Zapata Times was first published on August 16, 2008 and is delivered every Saturday to 4,000 homes in Zapata County free of charge.

External links

Zapata Times
Zapata Times mobile website
Hearst subsidiary profile of the Laredo Morning Times

Weekly newspapers published in Texas
Mass media in Laredo, Texas
Hearst Communications publications